Herrick Johnson (September 21, 1832 – November 20, 1913) was a leading American Presbyterian clergyman and author.

Born in Auriesville, New York, Johnson graduated from Hamilton College in 1857 and from the Auburn Theological Seminary in 1860. On September 6, 1860, he married Katherine Spencer Hardenburg. After ministering in churches in Troy, New York, Pittsburgh, Pennsylvania, Chicago, Illinois, and Philadelphia, Pennsylvania, he returned to Auburn Theological Seminary to teach, also teaching at McCormick Theological Seminary in Chicago. In 1882, he was elected moderator of the General Assembly of the Presbyterian Church in the United States of America. He was extensively quoted in the 1895 Dictionary of Burning Words of Brilliant Writers.

References 

1832 births
1913 deaths
Presbyterian Church in the United States of America ministers
19th-century Presbyterian ministers
People from Montgomery County, New York
Auburn Theological Seminary alumni
Hamilton College (New York) alumni
19th-century American clergy